Chiaki Ohara is a Japanese pianist known for her collaboration in musical pieces such as "Hall Of Mirrors" and "Fantasy".

Early life 
Chiaki Ohara, born in Osaka, Japan, received her first piano lessons 
at the age of four. From 1972 to 1975 she attended the high school
of Osaka College of Music, where since 1963 she has already been
a piano student of Prof. Tetsuro Kanzawa. 
In parallel, she took private lessons with Tomiko Miyajima from 1974 to 1980.

Currently, she also performs regularly in duo with 
Sandra Leonie Ritter (saxophone). 
This cooperation is already equipped with its own CD production, 
released at the label "music Leondra documented". 
Other chamber music partner of Chiaki Ohara included Sergio Azzolini, 
Ingo Goritzki, Dennis Kuhn, Peter Leiner, Will Sanders and Markus Stockhausen.

References 
http://www.frenchhorn-soloist.com/french-horn-soloist.html
http://www.knorr-stiftung.de/programm_ro.html
https://translate.google.com/translate?hl=en&sl=de&u=http://www.muho-mannheim.de/personal/Bios/ohara_chiaki.htm&ei=HDWlSYrfD5DM6gOhwNjYAg&sa=X&oi=translate&resnum=5&ct=result&prev=/search%3Fq%3Dchiaki%2Bohara%26start%3D10%26hl%3Den%26rlz%3D1B3GGGL_enMY276MY282%26sa%3DN

Living people
Japanese classical pianists
Japanese women pianists
People from Osaka
21st-century classical pianists
21st-century Japanese women musicians
Year of birth missing (living people)
Osaka College of Music alumni
21st-century women pianists